The Type 94 900 hp liquid-cooled in-line was a W-18 liquid-cooled aircraft engine.
Two Type 94 engines were used to power the Imperial Japanese Navy Hiro G2H land-based bomber in 1933. The Type 94 engine was the eighteen-cylinder version of the Hiro Type 90 600 hp water-cooled W-12/Hiro Type 91 520 hp water-cooled W-12 engines.

Applications
 Hiro G2H land-based bomber

Specifications (variant)

References

Bibliography
Mikesh, Robert C. and Abe, Shorzoe. Japanese Aircraft 1910-1941. London:Putnam, 1990. 

1930s aircraft piston engines